Karl Spindler (October 16, 1796 – July 12, 1855) was a German novelist.

Biography
Spindler was born in Breslau, and educated at Strasburg.  He joined a company of strolling players in Germany, and resided from 1832 at Baden-Baden.  He died at Freiersbach, Baden, aged 58.

Works
His reputation rests on his historical romances:
 Der Bastard (3 vols., Zürich, 1826)
 Der Jude (4 vols., Stuttgart, 1827)
 Der Jesuit (3 vols., 1829)
 Der Invalide (5 vols., 1831).

His complete works include 102 volumes (1831–54), besides minor novels contained in his periodical publication Vergissmeinnicht (1830–55).

Notes

References

1796 births
1855 deaths
German journalists
German male journalists
People from Wrocław
People from Baden-Baden
German male novelists
19th-century German novelists
19th-century German male writers